Picture This may refer to:

Music 
 Picture This (band), an Irish pop rock band

Albums 
 Picture This (Gary Burton album), 1982
 Picture This – The Essential Blondie Collection, 1998
 Picture This (Huey Lewis and the News album), 1982
 Picture This (Wet Wet Wet album), 1995
 Picture This (Do or Die album), 1996
 Picture This (Picture This album), 2017
 Picture This, a 1997 album by Jim Brickman
 Picture This, a 1993 album by Debbie Davies

Songs 
 "Picture This", the lead single from Kero Kero Bonito's debut album Bonito Generation
 "Picture This" (song), a song by Blondie from the 1978 album Parallel Lines
 "Picture This (Interlude)" a song by Danity Kane from the album Welcome To The Dollhouse
 "Picture This", a song by Big Time Rush from their 2013 album 24/Seven
 "Picture This", a song by the Beastie Boys from Hello Nasty

Literature 
 Picture This (novel), a 1988 novel by Joseph Heller

Film, TV and radio 
 Picture This (film), a 2008 film starring Ashley Tisdale
 Picture This, the second series of the British radio series The Chain Gang
 Picture This (British TV series), a 2008 British cross-platform project about photography that included a short television series on Channel 4
 Picture This (American TV program), a 1948–1949 American 10-minute television program hosted by Wendy Barrie that aired on NBC
 Picture This, a 1963 American game show hosted by Jerry Van Dyke on CBS
 Picture This!, an episode of Barney & Friends
 Picture This, an episode of season 2 of Phineas and Ferb